Mubarak Ali was an Indian cricketer. He played in 42 first-class matches between 1934 and 1937. He took a hat-trick in the 1936–37 Ranji Trophy playing for Nawanagar against Western India. He picked two wickets with successive balls in the first innings and the third with the first ball of the second innings.

See also
 List of hat-tricks in the Ranji Trophy

References

External links

Year of birth missing
Possibly living people
Indian cricketers
Muslims cricketers
Nawanagar cricketers
Northern India cricketers
Place of birth missing (living people)